British Sugar plc is a subsidiary of Associated British Foods and the sole British producer of sugar from sugar beet, as well as medicinal cannabis.

British Sugar processes all sugar beet grown in the United Kingdom, and produces about two-thirds of the United Kingdom's quota of sugar, with the remainder produced by the brand Tate & Lyle, under licence to American Sugar Refining, and by imports. British Sugar and the growers fix a contract called the "Inter Professional Agreement" determining the price paid for beet grown and the allocation of growers' quotas. The National Farmers Union (NFU) is the negotiator for the growers.

History

Early history
The company was formed as the British Sugar Corporation in 1936, when the British parliament nationalised the entire sugar beet crop processing industry, under the banner of British Sugar Corporation. At this time, there were 13 separate companies with 18 factories across the country. In 1972, it began selling its sugar products under the name of Silver Spoon.

In 1977, a rights issue decreased the government holding from 36% to 24%. In May 1982, the company name was shortened to British Sugar plc, and later that year it was taken over by Berisford International.

After a crash in property values affected Berisford, it was sold to Associated British Foods (ABF) on 2 January 1991.

Closures
The sugar refinery in Cupar, Fife, closed in 1971 ending the growth and processing of sugar beet in Scotland; in its heyday in the mid-1930s, 1,500 farmers supplied the Cupar factory.  In 1981, the Ely, Felsted, Nottingham and Selby factories closed after a reduction in the allowed sugar quota. This was followed by the closure of sites at Spalding in 1989, Peterborough and Brigg in 1991, King's Lynn in 1994, Bardney and Ipswich in 2001, Kidderminster in 2002, and Allscott and York in 2007. The site at Allscott, which opened in 1927, near Telford, Shropshire, was closed because it "lacked scale" to be run economically, while the site at York, North Yorkshire (opened 1926), was closed due to the poor crop yields in northern England.

Of the 18 factories which were owned by the British Sugar Corporation, only four still process beet - Bury St Edmunds (Suffolk), Cantley (in Norfolk, the second and first successful British sugar factory in 1912), Newark-on-Trent (Nottinghamshire) and Wissington (western Norfolk and the largest in Europe). The Bury site is also a major packaging plant for Silver Spoon.

The 12 sites already closed have been sold and decommissioned to various degrees – many large concrete silos (for storing the major product, white granulated sugar) still remain even where the sites have been closed, including those at the Kidderminster factory which was closed in 2002 and sold off in 2006. The concrete silos at the Ipswich site were demolished in 2018, 17 years after the site closed. Allscott has now been completely demolished. Spalding has been replaced by Spalding power station. BP and DuPont are working with British Sugar to build a bioethanol plant at BP's Hull site, as described in an announcement made in June 2007.

Operations
British Sugar is effectively the sole buyer of all of the sugar beet grown in Britain. This output comes from around 3,500 farmers throughout Britain.  There is however a proposal to start growing sugar beet in Eastern Scotland again to produce bioethanol. British Sugar is a supplier of cannabis to GW Pharmaceuticals.

Management
The managing director, Paul Kenward, is married to Victoria Atkins MP.

See also 
 Bioethanol

References

External links

British Sugar at Kidderminster
Ipswich Sugar Factory photos taken in 2006
 Exploring British Sugar, Kidderminster
 Exploring British Sugar, Bardney
 

Food manufacturers of the United Kingdom
British companies established in 1936
Food and drink companies established in 1936
Sugar companies
Companies based in Peterborough
Companies based in Cambridgeshire
Associated British Foods
1936 establishments in the United Kingdom
British Royal Warrant holders
Sugar industry in the United Kingdom
Agriculture companies of the United Kingdom